Brod  (Serbian Cyrillic: Брод)  is a village in south of Kosovo, in the region of Gora, in the municipality of Dragaš.  It is part of the District of Prizren. The majority of people are Gorani. Brod is a big village with 900 houses.

Religion 
The people of Brod are Muslims.

Language 

The Gorani speak Našinski. A small part near the cities also speak Albanian, as well as Serbian. In the 1991 Yugoslav census, 54.8% of the inhabitants of the Gora municipality said they spoke the Gorani language (Našinski), roughly in proportion to the number who considered themselves primarily ethnic Gorani.

Culture 
The Gorani have a varied cuisine and are traditionally known for their confections.

Traditional music 
Traditional Gorani folk music includes a two-beat dance called kolo, which is a circle dance focused on foot movements. The dance is always started by using right foot and moving in a counterclockwise direction. Koło is usually accompanied by instrumental music made often with a Zurle or Kaval and tapan or Davul. Kolos are less frequently accompanied by singing as they are in neighboring ethnic groups such as the Albanians and Serbs.

There is also a great part of Gorani history in their lyrics and songs. Uniquely, they sing about the long journey to Turkey, about broken hearts and love. Their songs are performed by men and women.

Nature 
There is a canyon near the village.

Notes and references 

Notes:

References:

External links 

 Brod
 TripIt

Gorani people
Villages in Dragash